Jesse Joseph Tafero (October 12, 1946 – May 4, 1990) was convicted of murder and executed via electric chair in the U.S. state of Florida for the murders of 39-year-old Florida Highway Patrol officer Phillip A. Black (who served 9 years with Florida Highway Patrol) and 39-year-old Ontario Provincial Police Corporal Donald Irwin (who served 18 years with Ontario Provincial Police), a visiting Canadian constable and friend of Black. The officers were killed during a traffic stop where Tafero, his wife Sunny Jacobs and their children were passengers. Tafero's execution was botched; his head burst into flames during the execution by electric chair. After Tafero's execution, the driver, Walter Rhodes, confessed to shooting the officers, but later retracted his testimony.

1967 crimes 
At the time of the murders, Tafero was on parole for attempted rape, holding two women hostage.

Murders, trial, and execution  
On the morning of February 20, 1976, Black and Irwin approached a car parked at a rest stop for a routine check. Tafero, his wife Sonia "Sunny" Jacobs, their two children (ages 9 years and 10 months) and Walter Rhodes were found asleep inside. Tafero had previously been in prison and was on probation. Black saw a gun lying on the floor inside the car. He woke the occupants and had first asked Rhodes then Tafero to come out of the car.

According to Rhodes, Tafero then shot both Black and Irwin with the gun (which was legally registered to Jacobs who bought guns on behalf of Tafero – he couldn't legally obtain a license because of his record) and led the others into the police car to flee the scene. According to Tafero, Rhodes shot the officers and handed the gun to him so that Rhodes could drive.

They later disposed of the police car and kidnapped a man and stole his car. All three were arrested after being caught in a roadblock. When they were arrested, the gun was found in Tafero's waistband. This account, however, was later contradicted by Rhodes; there was subsequently enough evidence to support reasonable doubt regarding Tafero's conviction.

Gunpowder tests found residue on Rhodes consistent with "having discharged a weapon", residue on Tafero consistent with "handling an unclean or recently discharged weapon, or possibly discharging a weapon", as well as residue on Jacobs and her son consistent with "having handled an unclean or recently discharged weapon".

Prior to his conviction for murder, Tafero had been convicted of attempted robbery and "crimes against nature" when he was 20 years old.
Rhodes entered into a plea agreement for a reduced sentence of second degree murder in exchange for his testimony against Tafero and Jacobs. At their trial, he testified that Jacobs fired first from the back seat, then Tafero took the gun from her and shot the two officers. Rhodes later recanted his testimony on three occasions, in 1977, 1979 and 1982, stating that he shot the policemen, but ultimately reverted to his original testimony.

Tafero and Jacobs were convicted of capital murder and were sentenced to death while Rhodes was sentenced to three life terms. He was released in 1994 following parole for good behavior.  The children were placed in the care of Sunny Jacobs's parents until their deaths in a 1982 plane crash. The children were then separated and Sunny's younger child, Christina, was placed into foster care with a friend of Jacobs.

Tafero and Jacobs continued their relationship through letters while serving time in the prison. Because there was no death row for women in Florida, Jacobs was put into solitary confinement for the first five years of her imprisonment and let out only once or twice a week for exercise. She learned yoga to pass the time, and after being moved to the general prison population, began teaching yoga to other prisoners.

Although the jury had recommended a life sentence for Jacobs, Judge Daniel Futch, known as "Maximum Dan" for his reputation for tough sentences, imposed the death sentence. In 1981, the Florida Supreme Court commuted Jacobs' sentence to life in prison, holding that Futch lacked sufficient basis to override the jury's sentencing recommendation.

Tafero was to be executed by electrocution. The machine, dubbed "Old Sparky", malfunctioned, causing six-inch flames to shoot out of Tafero's head. A member of the execution team had used a synthetic sponge rather than a sea sponge, which is necessary to provide greater conductivity and a quick death. In all, three jolts of electricity were required to execute Tafero, a process that took seven minutes. Prison inmates later claimed that Old Sparky was "fixed" and tampered with to make Tafero's execution more like torture. It has been rumored that Tafero's death served as inspiration for author Stephen King when he wrote the execution of Eduard Delacroix in his novel The Green Mile.

Aftermath
The case became a cause célèbre among death penalty opponents, who cited the brutal circumstances of Tafero's execution as reasons it should be abolished. Rhodes did not receive further jail time.

Filmmaker Micki Dickoff made a crime drama on the case entitled In the Blink of an Eye, which aired as an ABC Movie of the Week in 1996. Sunny Jacobs, even though she had not been exonerated, is featured in The Exonerated, a made-for-cable television film, first aired on the former CourtTV cable television network on January 27, 2005.

When her death sentence was overturned in 1981, she was sentenced to life with a 25-year minimum mandatory sentence. In 1992, when her case was reversed on appeal, she took an Alford plea for second-degree murder and was released on time served. In 2011, Jacobs married Peter Pringle, who had been exonerated after being convicted of capital murder and sentenced to death in the Republic of Ireland. (Pringle's sentence was commuted to life imprisonment, the death penalty having been abolished in practice in Ireland since 1954, abolished for ordinary murder in 1964, and permanently abolished for all crimes in 1990.)

Since their releases, Sunny and Peter Pringle have founded The Sunny Centre where they help other exonerees with their healing process. The centre is non-profit and gives individuals support upon leaving prison. The couple welcome exonerees into their home and incorporate a holistic approach to healing through yoga, meditation and prayer.

See also 
Capital punishment debate
Capital punishment debate in the United States
Capital punishment in the United States
List of people executed in Florida
List of wrongful convictions in the United States
Wrongful executions in the United States

External links 
List of Florida executions
List of all prisoners executed in Florida
Execution Day Journal

References

1946 births
1990 deaths
20th-century executions by Florida
American robbers
American people executed for murdering police officers
20th-century executions of American people
People convicted of murder by Florida
People executed by Florida by electric chair